

Seal Bay is a locality in the Australian state of South Australia located on the south coast of Kangaroo Island overlooking the body of water known in Australia as the Southern Ocean and by international authorities as the Great Australian Bight.

Its boundaries were created in 2002 in respect to “the long established name.”

The majority land use within the locality is conservation while a smaller amount of land within the centre of the locality is zoned for agriculture.  The former use consists of the full extent of the Seal Bay Conservation Park and part of the western end of the Cape Gantheaume Wilderness Protection Area which occupies part of the eastern side of the locality.

Seal Bay is located within the federal division of Mayo, the state electoral district of Mawson and the local government area of the Kangaroo Island Council.

References
Notes

Citations

Towns on Kangaroo Island